The 1918–19 Tennessee Volunteers basketball team represents the University of Tennessee during the 1918–19 college men's basketball season. The head coach was  R. H. Fitzgerald coaching the team in his first season. The Volunteers team captain was Frank Callahan.

Schedule

|-

References

Tennessee Volunteers basketball seasons
Tennessee
Tennessee Volunteers
Tennessee Volunteers